The following is a list of groups and artists associated with the Second British Invasion music phenomenon, that occurred during the early and mid-1980s and was associated with MTV, including new wave music.

A

ABC
Adam and the Ants
After the Fire
The Alarm

B

Bananarama
Belouis Some
Big Country
Bow Wow Wow

C

Elvis Costello
Culture Club
The Cure

D

Def Leppard
Depeche Mode
Dexys Midnight Runners
Dire Straits
Thomas Dolby
Duran Duran

E

The English Beat
Eurythmics

F

Fastway
A Flock of Seagulls
The Fixx
Frankie Goes to Hollywood

G
Eddy Grant

H

Haircut One Hundred
Heaven 17
The Human League

I

Billy Idol
Iron Maiden

J

Joe Jackson
Howard Jones
Joy Division

K
Kajagoogoo
Nik Kershaw

L

Nick Lowe

M

Madness
Modern English
Alison Moyet

N

Naked Eyes
New Order
Gary Numan

O
Orchestral Manoeuvres in the Dark

P

Pet Shop Boys
The Police
The Pretenders

S

Simple Minds
Soft Cell
Spandau Ballet
The Specials
Squeeze
The Style Council

T

Talk Talk
Tears for Fears
Thompson Twins

U
Ultravox

V
Visage

W

Wang Chung
Wham!

Y
Paul Young

See also
Second British Invasion
List of British Invasion artists

References

Further reading

Lists of musicians
British Invasion
British music-related lists